The Muddiman Committee or the Reforms Enquiry Committee (1924) was a committee led by Sir Alexander Muddinman, organized by the British and Indian government, to meet the demand of Indian leaders in the context of Indians new ( swaraj party resolution 1920]] (India's Independence). This committee would aid in investigating the diarchy issue on the Constitution as set up in 1921 under the Indian Council Act of 1919.

Noteworthy members 

 Sir Alexander Muddiman
 Sir Sivaswami Aiyar
 Dr. R. P. Paranjape
 Sir Tejbahadur Sapru
 Mohammad Ali Jinnah
 Bijoy Chand Mahtab

The Reports 
The reports created by the committee was divided into two parts due to disagreements, the majority report and minority report. 

The Majority Report declared by officials that a diarchy had not been established, has not been given a fair trial run, and so only minor changes in non-official Indians were recommended 

The Minority Report declared by nonofficials that the Act of 1919 had failed, and that they need a Constitution that has a permanent basis with a provision for automatic progress in the future.

Submitted in September 1925, the combination of these reports recommended the appointment of a Royal Commission.

Lord Birkenhead, the Secretary of State for India, stated that actions would be taken on the basis of the majority report.

References 

Indian independence movement